is a former Japanese footballer who last played for Giravanz Kitakyushu.

Club statistics
Updated to 2 February 2018.

References

External links

Profile at Giravanz Kitakyushu

1985 births
Living people
Komazawa University alumni
Association football people from Chiba Prefecture
Japanese footballers
J2 League players
Yokohama FC players
Giravanz Kitakyushu players
Association football midfielders